Otherhood is a 2019 American comedy film, directed by Cindy Chupack, from a screenplay by Chupack and Mark Andrus. It is based upon the 2008 novel Whatever Makes You Happy by William Sutcliffe, and follows three suburban mothers who show up to the New York City homes of their sons unannounced. It stars Angela Bassett, Patricia Arquette, Felicity Huffman, Jake Hoffman, Jake Lacy, and Sinqua Walls.

The film had its world premiere at 51Fest on July 21, 2019. It was released on August 2, 2019, by Netflix. The film received generally mixed to negative reviews, although Huffman's performance was critically praised.

Plot

Daniel Lieberman, Paul Halston-Myers and Matt Walker grew up together. Now, adults living in NYC, they ride with Daniel, on his way to propose to Erin. Using his key to enter, he comes across a naked man at his fridge and she comes out of the bedroom mostly naked, surprised to see him.

In Poughkeepsie, NY, Carol Walker, Gillian Lieberman and Helen Halston meet every Mother's Day to commiserate their sons not recognising the day and shutting them out. Gillian mentions swooping in on them, but then takes it back. Helen motivates them all to do a road trip to surprise them.

Carol jumps right in tidying up Matt's huge apartment. Helen loses her nerve and books a hotel room. Gillian tries at Daniel's, but as he doesn't answer also gets a room. Both Carol and Gillian call to report their progress, but Helen lies that she is staying with Paul. 

The next morning, Helen shows up at Paul's. When she introduces herself to his other gay roommates, she complains he never came out to them, although she always knew. Gillian also sees Daniel, but he comes across as resentful of the surprise. 

The mothers meet up to compare notes. Their talk motivates Helen to move out of the hotel. That night as she preps a meal for Paul's housemates, his boyfriend tells her a lot of his insecurity comes from abandonment issues as, after her divorce she never had time for him.

When Gillian returns to Daniel's he's out, so she lets herself in through an improperly closed window. He's gone out with Alison, a recently-divorced Jewish woman whose number Gillian gave him. He cuts the date short as she triggers his memory of his very recent breakup.

At dinner at Paul's, when Helen shares that he'd never come out to her, he says that he had with his father years ago, she gets upset. Once alone, he apologizes, but she gets upset all over again when mentioning his boyfriend's theory that he's got abandonment issues because of her. 

Matt tells Carol he has a work party that night for his magazine, of which he is art director. Although not invited, they give her a makeover in Erin's salon. Carol apologizes for having been hard on her. They accompany her to the restaurant where Helen is to have lunch with Paul, and he reveals he was sperm donor for lesbian friends. Upsetting her again, Gillian and Carol are witness to it.

Carol crashes his work party while Helen and Gillian plan to go clubbing. She gets drunk with a Julia and when he sees her he tries to get her to go home. Instead she calls Helen and Gillian to go out. They live it up, getting pizza, going clubbing and dancing all night.     

In the morning, Julia stops by Matt's to leave something of Carol's. When he realises she hadn't returned, he gathers Paul and Daniel and they find their three mothers, nursing hangovers in Gillian's hotel room.  Afterwards, the three go together to get presents for Paul's sperm baby. In the shop, the truth comes out that all three of their husbands cheated on the same weekend. Helen divorced hers, Gillian forgave hers and Carol didn't know about it.

Then each mother does her part to get closure will her son. Carol tells Matt she is going to focus on herself for awhile. Helen, having pushed Paul into giving her an address, shows up unannounced and one of the mothers lets her hold the baby. Gillian apologizes to Daniel for her interference with Erin, tells him how she'd forgiven his dad for infidelity and encourages him to try to catch Erin before its too late. 

Matt asks Julia to meet up to help him to write the 10 things he knows about Carol, which he sends to her house along with a bouquet of her favorite flowers. She angrily takes her deceased husband's fishing paraphernalia and throws it into the pool. Daniel catches up to Erin's moving van, offering to drive as she's determined to leave.

One year later at Gillian's house in Poughkeepsie, before Daniel and a pregnant Erin tie the knot, Carol comes. She's with Matt who is dating Julia, on return from time in Europe after selling her house. Paul is also present with his boyfriend, the lesbian mothers who got his sperm and their daughter, Helen's granddaughter.

Cast

Production
In April 2018, Patricia Arquette and Angela Bassett joined the cast of the film, with Cindy Chupack directing the film, from a screenplay written by Chupack and Mark Andrus, based upon the novel Whatever Makes You Happy by William Sutcliffe. Jason Michael Berman and Cathy Schulman will produce the film, under their Mandalay Pictures and Welles Entertainment banners, respectively. Arquette and Bassett will executive produce the film. Netflix will distribute. In May 2018, Sinqua Walls joined the cast of the film. In June 2018, Felicity Huffman, Jake Lacy and Jake Hoffman joined the cast.

Filming
Principal photography began on June 11, 2018, in New York City.

Release
It had its world premiere at 51Fest on July 21, 2019. The film was originally scheduled to have been released on April 26, 2019. However, because of Felicity Huffman's involvement in the 2019 college admissions bribery scandal, the release date was postponed to August 2, 2019. On October 17, 2019, Netflix announced that the film had been viewed by over 29 million viewers after its release on their platform.

Reception
The site's critical consensus reads, "Otherhood wastes its three talented leading actresses on a forgettable dramedy about motherhood that lacks humor and feels forced." On Metacritic, the film has a weighted average score of 38 out of 100, based on 6 critics, indicating "generally unfavorable reviews".

References

External links
 
 

2019 comedy films
2019 films
American comedy films
Films about families
Films based on British novels
Films set in New York City
Films shot in New York City
English-language Netflix original films
Films scored by Marcelo Zarvos
2010s English-language films
2010s American films